The Gorzente is an Apennine torrent of the Po basin in north-west Italy. A tributary of the Piota, it flows through the territory of the communes of Campomorone, Bosio, Mornese, Casaleggio Boiro, Lerma and Tagliolo Monferrato.

Course 
Its upper course takes the Gorzente in a north-westerly direction through the wild and uninhabited landscape between Monte delle Figne, elevation , and Monte Tobbio, which for the most part falls within the Parco Regionale delle Capanne di Marcarolo, until it is dammed to form the two lakes known as the Laghi di Lavagnina. From here its course turns to the west and the river flows into the Piota at Case Possidenti, a locality of Tagliolo Monferrato.

Notes
The original version of this article included material translated from Gorzente, its counterpart in the Italian Wikipedia.

Rivers of Italy
Rivers of the Province of Alessandria
Rivers of the Province of Genoa
Rivers of the Apennines